The 2021 Kennesaw State Owls football team represented the Kennesaw State University as a member of the Big South Conference during the 2021 NCAA Division I FCS football season. Led by seventh-year head coach Brian Bohannon, the Owls played their home games at the Fifth Third Bank Stadium in Kennesaw, Georgia.

Schedule
Kennesaw State announced its 2021 football schedule on April 21, 2021. The 2021 schedule consisted of 5 home and 6 away games in the regular season.

References

Kennesaw State Owls
Kennesaw State Owls football seasons
Big South Conference football champion seasons
2021 NCAA Division I FCS playoff participants
Kennesaw State Owls football